The 2013–14 Scottish Championship was the 19th season in the current format of 10 teams in the second-tier of Scottish football. This was the first season of the competition being part of the newly formed Scottish Professional Football League after the merger of the Scottish Premier League and the Scottish Football League.

Dundee won the title.

Teams
Queen of the South were promoted as 2012–13 Scottish Second Division champions, with Alloa Athletic promoted after defeating Dunfermline Athletic 3-1 on aggregate in the play-off final.

Stadia and locations

Personnel and kits

League table
It was a close race for the championship, which offered automatic promotion to the 2014–15 Scottish Premiership. Dundee went into the final day in first place, but Hamilton Academical and Falkirk also had a chance of winning the championship.

Season statistics

Top scorers

Results
Teams play each other four times in this league. In the first half of the season each team plays every other team twice (home and away) and then do the same in the second half of the season, for a total of 36 games.

First half of season

Second half of season

Championship play-offs

Semi-finals

First leg

Second leg

Cowdenbeath won 5–2 on aggregate.

Dunfermline Athletic won 4–2 on aggregate.

Final

First leg

Second leg

Cowdenbeath won 4–1 on aggregate.

References

Scottish Championship seasons
2013–14 Scottish Professional Football League
2
ScotC